William Jewell (1884 – after 1907) was an English professional footballer who played as a winger.

References

1884 births
English footballers
Association football wingers
Royal Engineers A.F.C. players
Grimsby Town F.C. players
English Football League players
Year of death missing